The Storybook Series with Hayley Mills (also known as Grimm's Fairy Tales and Storybook Series) is a 1986 American animated television/video series hosted by Hayley Mills, who would introduce stories that were both contemporary and classic.

This series featured the voice talents of the Mickey Rooney, Georgia Engel, Louis Nye, Michael York, Arte Johnson, James Earl Jones, Ruth Buzzi, John Carradine, Hans Conried, Tammy Grimes, June Foray and Lucille Bliss.

The complete series was released on DVD through Mill Creek Entertainment on January 17, 2017.

Episodes
 Hug Me / Silver Pony / Creole
 Hardlucky / The Furious Flycycle
 Someone New / Ghost in the Shed / The Reluctant Dragon
 The Practical Princess / Beauty and the Beast
 The Fisherman and His Wife / Tom Thumb
 Seven with One Blow / The Youth Who Wanted to Shiver
 Three Golden Hairs / Hans in Luck
 I'm Not Oscar's Friend Anymore / Myra / Martha and the Mother Store / The Man Who Had No Dream
 The Legend of Paul Bunyan / The Wave
 The Legend of Sleepy Hollow / Just Say Hic
 The Beginning / Who Do You Think Should Belong in the Club?
 Good Goodies / Noises in the Night / All the Morning Early
 Birds of a Feather / Modern Life / My Mother is the Most Beautiful Woman in the World

Cast
Hayley Mills as Herself / Host
Georgia Engel as Creole
Arte Johnson as the Alligator
Mickey Rooney
Claire Bloom as Beauty
Michael York as Beast
Hans Conried as the Fisherman
June Foray as the Fisherman's Wife
Tammy Grimes as the Practical Princess

External links
The Storybook Series with Hayley Mills at Internet Movie Database

1984 animated films
1984 films
American children's animated fantasy films
Films based on Grimms' Fairy Tales
Brothers Grimm
Films based on fairy tales
1980s American films